Jesús Cono Aguiar Moreira (born 19 July 1968 in Montevideo) is a retired Uruguayan footballer.

Club career
In Uruguay he played for 4 clubs, Centro Atlético Fénix, Defensor Sporting Club, Club Nacional de Football and Club Atlético River Plate. He scored six goals, two from penalty kicks and one of a free kick, with Fénix. Aguiar also had a spell with Veracruz.

International career
Aguiar made three appearances for the senior Uruguay national football team, all during 2003.

References

External links
 

1968 births
Living people
Footballers from Montevideo
Uruguayan footballers
Uruguay international footballers
C.D. Veracruz footballers
Club Nacional de Football players
Centro Atlético Fénix players
C.S.D. Macará footballers
Club Atlético River Plate (Montevideo) players
L.D.U. Portoviejo footballers
Liga MX players
Uruguayan expatriate footballers
Expatriate footballers in Mexico
Expatriate footballers in Ecuador
Association football defenders